Life Express is a 2004 Hong Kong-Taiwanese action drama film directed by and co-starring Blackie Ko in his final film appearance before his death in 2003. The film also stars Richie Jen and Ruby Lin

Synopsis
The film revolves around a little boy who has leukemia and is waiting for a marrow transplant. While back in Taiwan, it concentrates on the story of a doctor, Kao Chi-yuen (Richie Jen) and a nurse, Suen Yan-yan (Ruby Lin), who is his girlfriend. Chi-yuen is a young doctor who stands for justice and does the best he can to help his patients.

They cannot find a willing bone marrow donor. They seek help from a prisoner, Ng Sung-yung (Blackie Ko). Ng is convinced to become a bone marrow donor for the little boy. The marrow must be transferred from Taiwan to Beijing in 24 hours, but an earthquake causes a power cut and also damages a bridge on the way to the airport. The car has to fly across the gap.

Luckily, they make it in time for the airplane. At the airport, Yan-yan accepts Chi-yuen's marriage proposal. The transplant operation is successful.

Cast
Richie Jen as Kao Chi-yuen doctor
Ruby Lin as Suen Yan-yan. a social Worker
Blacky Ko as Ng Sung-yung, a prisoner and bone marrow donor
Jiang Shan as Kuen
Gao Shu-guang as Dr. Lee Chu
Shi Yao as Yin-yin's mother
Liu Ci-hang as Luk-fai
Du Wei as Chan Kin-kao
Alan Ke as Bone marrow donor
Man Ying as Ng's mother
Morris Rong as Injured man
Yan Manqiu as Mrs. Chan
Tsai Chen-nam as Ng's cellmate
Niu Ben as Luk-fai's grandfather
Chu Chung-heng as Bon

External links
Yesasia US version DVD
 
 

Taiwanese action drama films
2004 films
2004 action drama films
Hong Kong action drama films
Medical-themed films
2000s Cantonese-language films
Films set in Taiwan
Films set in Beijing
Films shot in Taiwan
Films shot in Beijing
Films directed by Blackie Ko
2000s Hong Kong films